Goli Jan (also Romanized as Golī Jān and Golījān; also known as Golūjān, Gūlalījān, Gulujan, and Gyulyudzhan) is a village in Sanjabad-e Jonubi Rural District, Firuz District, Kowsar County, Ardabil Province, Iran. At the 2006 census, its population was 435, in 89 families.

References 

Tageo

Towns and villages in Kowsar County